Maria Angelica Cayuna (born August 17, 1998) is a Filipino volleyball athlete. Cayuna played for the Far Eastern University collegiate women's University team. She is currently plays for the Cignal HD Spikers in the Premier Volleyball League.

Volleyball career

UAAP 
Cayuna was a member of FEU Lady Tamaraws collegiate women's University and plays as a Setter in the UAAP. She made her debut as a Setter of the team in 2016.

In 2019, she became the captain of the FEU Lady Tamaraws.

In 2020, Cayuna made her final year in the UAAP Season 82 volleyball tournaments but eventually, the matches of the tournament was canceled due to the restrictions of the COVID-19 pandemic.

PVL 
Cayuna also joined United Volleyball Club in the Premier Volleyball League. She also signed in the PayMaya High Flyers in 2018. 

In 2021, she  make her comeback in the Premier Volleyball League when she was signed by the Perlas Spikers. 

In 2022, she was signed in Cignal HD Spikers.

Clubs 
United Volleyball Club - (2016-2017)
 PayMaya High Flyers - (2018) 
 Perlas Spikers - (2021)
  Cignal HD Spikers - (2022–present)

Awards

Individual

Collegiate

Clubs

References 

Filipino women's volleyball players
Living people
1998 births
Setters (volleyball)
Philippines women's international volleyball players